Caplinger Mills is an unincorporated community in northern Cedar County, Missouri, United States.  Several homes are located in the community, along with an old mill.  It is on the Sac River.

Caplinger Mills was settled in 1849. The community was named for Samuel Caplinger, the proprietor of a local mill.

The Caplinger Mills Historic District was listed on the National Register of Historic Places in 1993.

Notable person
 Kate Austin, radical writer and anarchist

References

Unincorporated communities in Cedar County, Missouri
Unincorporated communities in Missouri